Yusuf Mohammed Usman Edu (born 2 March 1994) is a Nigerian footballer who plays for Israeli club Sektzia Ness Ziona.

Career

Club
Usman started his professional career in Nigeria with Kaduna-based club Ranchers Bees. After a year, he left and joined Taraba whom he later helped to the gain promotion to the Nigerian Premier League. Usman was later named the captain of the club at 18, which made him the youngest captain in the league.

On 1 June 2019, FC Pyunik announced that they had released Usman by mutual consent.

He was released by Russian club FC Tambov in December 2019.

Honours
Nigeria U23
 Olympic Bronze Medal: 2016

References

External links

1994 births
Living people
Nigerian footballers
Taraba F.C. players
FC Tambov players
C.F. União players
Sarpsborg 08 FF players
FC Pyunik players
FC Shakhter Karagandy players
Hapoel Hadera F.C. players
Sektzia Ness Ziona F.C. players
Eliteserien players
Russian Premier League players
Armenian Premier League players
Kazakhstan Premier League players
Israeli Premier League players
Nigerian expatriate footballers
Expatriate footballers in Norway
Expatriate footballers in Armenia
Expatriate footballers in Russia
Expatriate footballers in Kazakhstan
Expatriate footballers in Israel
Nigerian expatriate sportspeople in Norway
Nigerian expatriate sportspeople in Armenia
Nigerian expatriate sportspeople in Russia
Nigerian expatriate sportspeople in Kazakhstan
Nigerian expatriate sportspeople in Israel
Association football midfielders
2015 Africa U-23 Cup of Nations players
Footballers at the 2016 Summer Olympics
Olympic footballers of Nigeria
Medalists at the 2016 Summer Olympics
Olympic bronze medalists for Nigeria
Olympic medalists in football
Nigeria A' international footballers
2016 African Nations Championship players